Virendra Kumar Sakhlecha  was the Chief Minister of Madhya Pradesh from 18 January 1978 to 19 January 1980. Here are the names of ministers in his ministry:

Cabinet Ministers
Virendra Kumar Sakhlecha-Chief minister
Kailash Joshi
Ramhit Gupta
Shitala Sahai
Haribhau Joshi
Laxmi Narayan Sharma
Yeshwant Rao Meghawale
Jabar Singh
Shiv Prasad Chandpuria  
Umrao Singh
Jayashree Banerjee
Ramanand Singh
Sakharam Patel
Sita Prasad Sharma
Anood Singh Maravi
Baliram Kashyap
Prabhunarayan Tripati
Laxminarayan Yadav 
Pawan Diwan
Mohammad Yaqoob Rajwan
Jang Bahadur Singh 
Shareef Master

Ministers of State
 Rajendra Dharkar
Manharan Lal Pandey
Jagdish Gupta
Vibhash Chandra Banerjee 
Parashuram Sahu
Nathuram Ahirwar
Sharas Chandra Jharia
Smt. Savita Bajpai
Ramlal Chandrakar 
Thakur Darbar Singh
Rama Shanker Singh

References

Saklecha
1978 in India
Janata Party state ministries
1978 establishments in Madhya Pradesh
1980 disestablishments in India
Cabinets established in 1978
Cabinets disestablished in 1980